Platter Kill is a river in Schoharie County in the state of New York. It flows into the Schoharie Creek. The Platter Kill's  watershed accounts for about 1.2 percent of the Schoharie basin.

Hydrology

The United States Geological Survey (USGS) has maintained one stream gauge along Platter Kill in operation since 1975.

References

Rivers of Schoharie County, New York